San Francisco Township is a rural township in Carver County, Minnesota, United States. The population was 888 as of the 2000 census.

History
San Francisco Township was organized in 1858, and named after San Francisco, California.

Geography
According to the United States Census Bureau, the township has a total area of 24.0 square miles (62.2 km), of which 23.1 square miles (60.0 km) is land and 0.9 square miles (2.3 km) (3.66%) is water.

Township 114 North, Range 24 West, Fifth Principal Meridian of the Public Land Survey System.

Lakes
 Hallquist Lake
 Horse Shoe Lake
 Johnson Lake
 Kelly Lake
 Long Lake
 Lundquist Lake
 Rapid Lake
 Scott Lake

Adjacent townships
 Dahlgren Township (north)
 Louisville Township, Scott County (east)
 Sand Creek Township, Scott County (east)
 St. Lawrence Township, Scott County (southeast)
 Faxon Township, Sibley County (west)
 Hancock Township (west)
 Benton Township (northwest)

Cemetery
The township contains Swedish Methodist Cemetery.

Demographics

As of the census of 2000, there were 888 people, 293 households, and 242 families residing in the township. There were 300 housing units at an average density of 13.0/sq mi (5.0/km). The racial makeup of the township was 98.99% White, 0.11% Asian, 0.23% from other races, and 0.68% from two or more races. Hispanic or Latino of any race were 1.01% of the population.

There were 293 households, out of which 43.7% had children under the age of 18 living with them, 74.1% were married couples living together, 4.4% had a female householder with no husband present, and 17.1% were non-families. 11.3% of all households were made up of individuals, and 3.8% had someone living alone who was 65 years of age or older.  The average household size was 3.03 and the average family size was 3.33.

In the township the population was spread out, with 31.6% under the age of 18, 6.0% from 18 to 24, 31.6% from 25 to 44, 24.3% from 45 to 64, and 6.4% who were 65 years of age or older.  The median age was 37 years. For every 100 females, there were 114.5 males.  For every 100 females age 18 and over, there were 110.0 males.

The median income for a household in the township was $68,889, and the median income for a family was $70,313. Males had a median income of $43,750 versus $30,069 for females. The per capita income for the township was $24,734.  None of the families and 0.5% of the population were living below the poverty line, including no under eighteens and none of those over 64.

Politics

References

External links
 United States National Atlas
 United States Census Bureau 2007 TIGER/Line Shapefiles
 United States Board on Geographic Names (GNIS)

Townships in Carver County, Minnesota
Townships in Minnesota